The Americas Challenge is a curling challenge held by the World Curling Federation between teams in its Americas zone. The winner of the challenge qualifies their country for the World Curling Championships, and the runner-up for the World Qualification Event. The challenge is not automatically held every year, and only takes place when a team in the Americas zone challenges the second-ranked Americas team in that year's World Curling Championship (or the first-ranked team if the second-ranked is hosting).

History
The first challenge was held in 2009, with Brazil losing to the United States. Brazil again challenged and lost to the United States in 2010, 2015, and 2017. In January 2018, with the United States automatically qualifying as hosts of the 2018 World Men's Curling Championship, Brazil challenged and lost to Canada. The November 2018 challenge was the first to see more than two teams competing, with Guyana joining the challenge for the first time. In 2019, Mexico joined the challenge with Guyana not competing. United States would win again, going 4-0.

A women's event has only been held twice, in 2017 and 2019. In 2017, Brazil challenged the United States but lost. Brazil's women's team challenged the United States in November 2018, but conceded to the United States to qualify for the World Qualification Event. In 2019, Mexico joined the challenge but the United States still won going 4-0.

Champions

References

 
International curling competitions
International sports championships in the Americas
Curling competitions in Canada
Curling competitions in the United States
Recurring sporting events established in 2009
Recurring sporting events disestablished in 2021